Dailey is an unincorporated community in Champaign County, Illinois, United States. Dailey is located on a railroad line northeast of Royal.

References

Unincorporated communities in Champaign County, Illinois
Unincorporated communities in Illinois